Studio C is an American family-friendly, comedy sketch group created by Matt Meese and Jared Shores. Derek Marquis and Scott Swofferd share the job of executive producer on the show. It is produced by Meese, Luiz Malaman and BYU TV. Each half-hour long episode consists of about seven or eight comedy sketches performed by a group of comedians. Most are performed at BYU Studios in Provo, Utah in front of a studio audience. However, a couple sketches get filmed off-set and are aired, pre-recorded. All of the group's sketches are distributed on BYU TV and on YouTube.

The group was created in 2012, sprouting from a previous comedy group, Divine Comedy that was created by Meese at Brigham Young University. Studio C's name is a reference to the studio in the BYU Broadcasting Building where the show is primarily taped. As of December 2019, Studio C had a YouTube channel with over 2.3 million subscribers and almost 2 billion total views. Their channel features many skits from the show, along with a few YouTube exclusives. Studio C's most popular video is "Top Soccer Shootout Ever With Scott Sterling", which by the end of 2019 had over 70 million views on YouTube. Studio C posts new videos on YouTube every Tuesday and Friday.

In August 2018, it was confirmed that Studio C would have a 10th season but the ten original cast members would be leaving after the 9th season to create and star together on a new family-comedy network called JK! Studios. With Johnson and Pence returning to the show, the 10th season featured all-new cast members. The group's eleventh season began on April 6, 2020, and ended on June 15, 2020. During the twelfth season in October 2020, it was announced that original cast member Jason Gray would return for the series' fourteenth season in fall 2021.

Series overview

Episodes

Season 1 (2012)

Season 2 (2013)

Season 3 (2013)

Season 4 (2014)

Season 5 (2014)

Season 6 (2015–16)

Season 7 (2016–17)

Season 8 (2017–18)

Season 9 (2018–19)

Season 10 (2019–20)

Season 11 (2020)

Season 12 (2020)

Season 13 (2021)

Season 14 (2021)

Season 15 (2022)

Season 16 (2022)

Specials

References 

Studio C
2010s television-related lists